Dolichopus diadema is a species of fly in the family Dolichopodidae. It is found in the  Palearctic .

References

External links
representing Dolichopus at BOLD

diadema
Insects described in 1832
Asilomorph flies of Europe
Taxa named by Alexander Henry Haliday